Recaptured Love is a 1930 early talkie pre-Code musical drama film based on the play Misdeal by Basil Woon about a man who experiences a mid life crisis that results in his divorce. It stars Belle Bennett and John Halliday.

Plot
In this drama, a 50-year-old married man (played by John Halliday) goes with his wife (Belle Bennett) and son (Junior Durkin) to a nightclub in a fancy hotel in Detroit. He meets a gold-digger (Dorothy Burgess) there, singing the theme song of the picture, and eventually ends up going out with her on a subsequent occasion and falls in love with her. His wife finally finds out and this leads to her leaving him and getting a divorce in Paris. He is married to the gold-digger but finds life with her and her "jazz friends" to be too much for him. He begins to long for his old wife when he finds her in a nightclub with another man (Richard Tucker, not the famous tenor) and becomes jealous.

Cast
Belle Bennett as Helen Parr 
John Halliday as Brentwood Parr
Dorothy Burgess as Peggy Price 
Richard Tucker as Rawlings 
Junior Durkin as Henry Parr 
Brooks Benedict as Pat

Preservation
The film survives complete. It was transferred on to 16mm film by Associated Artists Productions in 1966 and shown on television. A 16mm copy is housed at the Wisconsin Center for Film & Theater Research. It is also preserved in the Library of Congress collection.

External links

References 

1930 films
Warner Bros. films
American comedy-drama films
American black-and-white films
Films directed by John G. Adolfi
1930 comedy-drama films
1930s English-language films
1930s American films